Grevillea acacioides is a species of flowering plant in the family Proteaceae and is endemic to inland Western Australia. It is an erect shrub with cylindrical leaves and erect groups of greenish-white or cream-coloured flowers.

Description

Taxonomy
 Grevillea acacioides was first formally described in 1986 by Donald McGillivray in his book New Names in Grevillea (Proteaceae), based on plant material collected from east of Sandstone by Charles Austin Gardner in 1931. The specific epithet (acacioides) means "Acacia-like".

Distribution and habitat
This grevillea usually grows in shrubland and is widespread between Cosmo Newbery, Wiluna, Perenjori, Ravensthorpe and Queen Victoria Spring in inland Western Australia.

References

acacioides
Eudicots of Western Australia
Proteales of Australia
Plants described in 1986